The Estonian Aviation Museum is located in Lange near Tartu in Estonia. It is the only aviation museum in the country.

The museum was founded in December 1999 in accordance with a private initiative procedure and officially opened to the public on 14 June 2002. It has been developed in different stages on the basis of European Union support financing and with the help of the private- and public sector.

Founder and director of the museum is Estonian engineer and former politician Mati Meos.

The museum consists of several buildings; one small building is used to present more than 400 aircraft models. A collection of military aircraft, airliners, training aircraft, ultralight aircraft, helicopters, gliders, aircraft engines, radar units and anti-aircraft guns is displayed in and around several hangars. There are also various attractions such as piloting- and parachute jumping simulators.

The museum has its own 450m-long airstrip. Tartu Ülenurme Airport is located 4 km away.

The Museum has staged the annual Estonian Aviation Days since 2006. The museum claims it is the biggest aviation event in the Baltic states. Estonian Aviation Days 2016 had the attendance of 13 000 people.

The Museum is closed in wintertime from November to May.

Departments 

In the Museum structure there are 8 departments:
 Aircraft models 
 Aircraft, helicopters and gliders
 Aircraft engines 
 Marine airforce
 Air traffic control (ATC), radars 
 Airfields 
 Air defence 
 Attractions

Collection 
Training aircraft
 PZL-104 Wilga
 PZL TS-11 Iskra (from Polish Air Force)
 Aero L-29 Delfín
 Aero L-39 Albatros
 Hawk HW-326 (from Finnish Air Force)

Ultra-light aircraft
 Aeroprakt A-22 Foxbat (flying)
                                         	  
Fighters
 Panavia Tornado F.3 (from Royal Air Force)
 F-104 ASA Starfighter (from Italian Air Force)
 MiG-21bis (from Polish Air Force)
 Saab J35 Draken (owned by Swedish Air Force Museum)
 MiG-23MLD
 Saab JA 37 Viggen (owned by Swedish Air Force Museum)
 SEPECAT Jaguar GR3 (from Royal Air Force)

Reconnaissance fighters
 Mirage III RS (from the Ministry of Defence of Switzerland)
 MiG-25 RPS
 Yak-28PP
			
Attack fighters
 Saab J32 Lansen (owned by Swedish Air Force Museum)
 Sukhoi Su-22M4
 F-4 Phantom II	

Bombers
 Sukhoi Su-24

 Gliders
 Blaník
 LAK-12

Agricultural aircraft
 Zlín Z 37
 Antonov An-2

Passenger aircraft
 Tu-134A3
 Yak-40                                                     
 An-2P
 Aero Commander 680 FL

Helicopters
 Mil Mi-2RL	 
 Mil Mi-8                       
 Robinson R22 (without engine)
 Robinson R44 (from Estonian Air Force)
 Schweizer S-300
 Kamov Ka-26

Anti-aircraft missiles
 Anti-aircraft cannon Flack 88
 Danish anti-aircraft cannon Madsen
 Surface-to-air missile S-75
 Surface-to-air missile S-125
 Surface-to-air missile S-200
 Surface-to-air missile SA-6
 Surface-to-air missile SA-8

Radars
 Remote monitoring radar P-37 (similar to P-35)
 Jak-28PP radar
 Draken-35 radar
 Il-76 radar
 Tesla OPRL-4 radar (from Kuressaare airfield)
 Antenna of DRL-7SK radar (from Tartu Ülenurme airfield)
 PN-671 precision approach radar

Engines
 Jak-28PP engine
 Il-76 engine
 F-104 ASA Starfighter engine
 Lansen-32 engine
 MiG-25 engine
 R44 engine
 Wilga 35 engine
 An-2 engine
 In-line engine of a recreational aircraft
 Mi-2 turbine
 S-75 rocket engine

Aircraft models
Aircraft models in scales 1:144, 1:72, 1:48 and 1:32, in total 400 models. Models of aircraft carrier and amphibious assault ship in scale 1:72. Launchers models in scale 1:72.

References

External links 

 Museum homepage (est, eng, rus)

Aerospace museums
Museums in Estonia
Kastre Parish